Iskia may refer to:
 Iskia company
 Iskia Las Mercedes
 Iskia Altamira
 Iskia (company), a fragrance firm owned by perfumer Olivia Giacobetti
 Iskia, the Greek name for Isca sullo Ionio, a town in Italy